Gray's General Store is a general store located at 4 Main Street in Adamsville, Rhode Island. Founded in 1788, it operated for almost 225 years and was reputed to be the oldest continually operating general store in the United States.

The store featured an old-fashioned marble soda fountain, cigar and tobacco cases, and Rhode Island johnnycakes. In 2007, U.S. Senator Jack Reed and then-Governor Donald Carcieri issued proclamations naming Gray's as the oldest continuously run general store in the country. The store was owned and operated by the same family since 1879, entailing seven generations. Gray's also was the location of the first post office in Little Compton, founded in 1804.

Gray's temporarily closed on Sunday, July 29, 2012, after the death of its proprietor due lack of interest in keeping the store open by relatives, citing that "the shop's finances aren't sustainable and a supermarket down the street has siphoned away business."

The store re-opened in the summer of 2013.

References

Companies based in Rhode Island
Buildings and structures in Newport County, Rhode Island
Tourist attractions in Newport County, Rhode Island
American companies established in 1788
General stores in the United States